Tetraphysa is a genus of plant in family Apocynaceae, first described as a genus in 1906. It is native to northwestern South America.

Species
 Tetraphysa lehmannii Schltr. - Colombia, Ecuador
 Tetraphysa tamana Morillo - El Tamá National Park in NW Venezuela

References

Asclepiadoideae
Apocynaceae genera